The 1929 Cornell Big Red football team was an American football team that represented Cornell University during the 1929 college football season.  In their tenth season under head coach Gil Dobie, the Big Red compiled a 6–2 record and outscored their opponents by a combined total of 204 to 60.

Schedule

References

Cornell
Cornell Big Red football seasons
Cornell Big Red football